Dan Joseph Stein is a South African psychiatrist who is a professor and Chair of the Dept of Psychiatry and Mental Health at the University of Cape Town, and Director of the South African MRC Unit on Risk & Resilience in Mental Disorders. Stein was the Director of UCT's early Brain and Behaviour Initiative, and was the inaugural Scientific Director of UCT's later Neuroscience Institute. He has also been a visiting professor at Mount Sinai School of Medicine in the United States.

Education
Stein studied medicine at the University of Cape Town, including an intercalated undergraduate degree with majors in biochemistry and psychology. He later trained in psychiatry, and completed a post-doctoral fellowship in the area of psychopharmacology at Columbia University. He subsequently completed doctoral degrees in clinical neuroscience and in philosophy at Stellenbosch University.

Career
Stein's work ranges from basic neuroscience, through clinical investigations and trials, and on to epidemiological and public mental health research. He looks at clinical practice and scientific research that integrates theoretical concepts and empirical data across these different levels, strengthening a biopsychosocial approach to mental health.

Having worked for many years in South Africa, he also seeks to establish integrative approaches to improving psychiatric services, training, and research in the context of a low and-middle-income country.

As chair of the department of psychiatry and mental health at the University of Cape Town, Stein has led work to integrate and improve psychiatric services, training, and research. He also led the University of Cape Town's Brain-Behaviour Initiative, which in turn provided a foundation for its Neuroscience Institute, the first on the African continent.

Soon after returning to South Africa from New York, he initiated the South African Medical Research Council (SAMRC) Unit on Anxiety & Stress Disorders. The Unit undertook basic neuroscience research on anxiety, initiated brain magnetic resonance imaging and neurogenetics research in the country, and conducted the first nationally representative community survey of mental disorders on the continent.

Stein has initiated and supported collaborations with and fellowships for African scientists. The Neuro-GAP study brought together researchers from Ethiopia, Kenya, South Africa, and Uganda, to work on the genetics of schizophrenia and bipolar disorder. Stein was the founding President of the African College of Neuropsychopharmacology.

Stein has been part of several international research collaborations, including work on neuroimaging (the Enhancing Neuroimaging by Meta-Analysis (ENIGMA) collaboration) and work on psychiatric epidemiology (the World Mental Health (WMH) Surveys). He chaired the workgroups of both the 5th edition of the Diagnostic and Statistical Manual of Mental Disorders (DSM-5) and the 11th edition of the International Classification of Disorders (ICD-11) on obsessive-compulsive and related disorders.

Stein has been ranked as one of the most cited anxiety disorder researchers globally, and his Google h-index is more than 150, one of the highest of any African scholar.

Publications
Stein has authored or edited over 40 volumes. These include volumes on clinical neuroscience: Cognitive-Affective Neuroscience of Mood and Anxiety Disorders; on clinical disorders: Handbook of Obsessive-Compulsive and Related Disorders; and on global mental health: Global Mental Health and Psychotherapy. He authored the Textbook of Anxiety Disorders, and the Textbook of Mood Disorders.

Stein's papers have been published in Science, Lancet, and World Psychiatry. or ORCID.

Psychiatry writings
Stein was Eric Hollander's first post-doctoral fellow, and subsequently led work in the area of obsessive-compulsive spectrum of disorders, including work on trichotillomania, and contributed to a number of publications for the DSM-5 and ICD-11 Workgroups on OC spectrum disorders, supporting the inclusion of these conditions in both nosologies.

In collaboration with Brian Harvey, Stein has contributed to work on animal models relevant to understanding the neurobiology of obsessive-compulsive disorder and posttraumatic stress disorder.  In particular, they helped to establish the deermouse model of stereotypy.

Stein has co-led ENIGMA-OCD with Odile van den Heuvel, ENIGMA-Anxiety with Nic van der Wee, Janna-Marie Bas-Hoogendam, and Nynke Groenewold; and ENIGMA-HIV with Neda Jehanshad.  This work has led to a number of key findings, including publications emphasizing the role of the thalamus in OCD.

Together with his doctoral student, Helena Thornton, Stein initiated work on the neuropsychology of Urbach-Wiethe disease (UWD).  Jack van Honk subsequently led a range of work on this condition.  His investigations have shed important light on the specific contribution of the basolateral amygdala (BLA) to a range of cognitive-affective processes.  For example, the BLA adaptively regulates escape behavior from imminent threat, a mechanism that is evolutionary conserved across rodents and humans.  Furthermore, the human BLA is essential for instrumental behaviors in social-economic interactions.

Stein has led or contributed to trials on anxiety and related disorders, including generalized anxiety disorder, obsessive-compulsive disorder, panic disorder, posttraumatic stress disorder, social anxiety disorder, and trichotillomania. He has also led or contributed to systematic reviews of such work, including a number of reviews for the Cochrane Collaboration. In the context of the low-middle income world, where there are limited numbers of psychiatrists and psychologists, it has been suggested that task-sharing approaches may be particularly relevant, and Stein has contributed to a number of trials of such interventions.

Stein undertook the first nationally representative survey of mental disorders in an African country. Additionally, he has led several cross-national publications of the World Mental Health Surveys.

The Drakenstein Child Health Study is a birth cohort study led by Heather Zar, and allows integrated investigation of the biological, psychological, and social determinants of health. Stein led work on the psychosocial aspects of the Study, and his team contributed findings on the relationship between maternal posttraumatic stress disorder and infant outcomes, on the association of maternal exposure to alcohol with infant brain imaging, and on the impact of maternal HIV status on infant neurodevelopment.

Philosophy writings
Stein has integrated his interests in psychiatry, neuroscience, and philosophy in his volumes on The Philosophy of Psychopharmacology:  Smart Pills, Happy Pills, Pep Pills and Problems of Living:  Perspectives from Philosophy, Psychiatry, and Cognitive-Affective Science. Philosophy of Psychopharmacology addresses some of the "hard problems" faced by mental health clinicians, with a particular focus on philosophical issues raised or addressed by advances in psychiatric medication. Problems of Living looks at a range of "hard problems" raised by life as a whole.

Awards
Stein's work has been funded by extramural grants, including a range of funding from the National Institutes of Health. He is a recipient of the International College of Neuropsychopharmacology's Max Hamilton Memorial Award for his contribution to psychopharmacology, the South African Medical Research Council's Platinum Award, and the World Federation of Societies of Biological Psychiatry's Lifetime Achievement Award.

References

External links
 Faculty page
 
 
 
 
 
 Mail & Guardian
 UCT News 

Academic staff of the University of Cape Town
South African psychiatrists
Stellenbosch University alumni
University of Cape Town alumni
Living people
Year of birth missing (living people)